The Miami ePrix was an automobile race of the Formula E championship in Miami, Florida, United States. It was only raced once in the 2014–15 season, of which it was held back with the Long Beach ePrix.

Circuit
The Biscayne Bay Street Circuit was first used for Formula E on March 14, 2015 for the 2015 Miami ePrix. The track was located in the heart of Downtown Miami, running along the coast of Biscayne Bay, in addition to making its way underneath the MacArthur Causeway and around the AmericanAirlines Arena, the home of NBA basketball team Miami Heat.

Results

References

 
Miami
Auto races in the United States
Sports competitions in Miami
Recurring sporting events established in 2015
2015 establishments in Florida